Tristano Pangaro (June 27, 1922 in Monfalcone – 2004) was an Italian professional footballer who played as a right-back.

References

External links

1922 births
2004 deaths
Italian footballers
Serie A players
Inter Milan players
Empoli F.C. players
U.S. Salernitana 1919 players
Association football defenders